Magdalena Tlacotepec  is a town and municipality in Oaxaca in south-western Mexico. The municipality covers an area of 234.75 km2.  
It is part of the Tehuantepec District in the west of the Istmo Region.

In 2005, the municipality had a total population of 1165.

References

Municipalities of Oaxaca